XCL is a three-letter abbreviation with multiple meanings, as described below:

 Xlib Compatibility Layer
 Cluff Lake Airport, the IATA airport code
 Classical Armenian, the ISO 639-3 code being xcl.
 eXtensible Characterisation Language developed at the University of Cologne
 the XML interchange format for Common logic